The 2006 National Football League, known for sponsorship reasons as the Allianz National Football League, was the 75th staging of the National Football League (NFL), an annual Gaelic football tournament for the Gaelic Athletic Association county teams of Ireland.

Kerry beat Galway in the final.

Format 
The top 16 teams are drawn into Divisions 1A and 1B. The other 16 teams are drawn into Divisions 2A and 2B. Each team plays all the other teams in its section once: either home or away. Teams earn 2 points for a win and 1 for a draw.

The top two teams in Divisions 2A and 2B progress to the Division 2 semi-finals and are promoted. The bottom two teams in Divisions 1A and 1B are relegated. The top two teams in Divisions 1A and 1B progress to the NFL semi-finals.

Division One

Division One (A) table

Division One (B) table

Semi-finals

Final

Division Two

Division Two (A) table

Division Two (B) table

References

External links

National Football League
National Football League (Ireland) seasons